HMS LST-405 was a Royal Navy tank landing ship of World War II. Built as a  she was transferred to the UK and served in the European and Mediterranean and Middle Eastern theatres.

Construction
LST-405 was laid down on 30 August 1942, under Maritime Commission (MARCOM) contract, MC hull 925, by the Bethlehem-Fairfield Shipyard, Baltimore, Maryland; launched 31 October 1942; then transferred to the United Kingdom and commissioned into the RN on 28 December 1942.

Service history 
The tank landing ship was sunk on 27 March, while in Royal Navy service. LST-405 was struck from the navy list on 17 April 1946.

See also 
 List of United States Navy LSTs

Notes 

Citations

Bibliography 

Online resources

External links

 

Ships built in Baltimore
1942 ships
LST-1-class tank landing ships of the Royal Navy
World War II amphibious warfare vessels of the United Kingdom
S3-M2-K2 ships
Maritime incidents in 1946